Botswana Energy Regulatory Authority (BERA)  is the energy regulator and a government parastatal of the Botswana government. The parastatal was founded after the Botswana Energy Regulatory Act was put in place in 2016 and started its operations on the 1st September, 2017.

See also 

 List of energy regulatory bodies
Botswana Power Corporation
 Botswana Railways
 Companies and Intellectual Property Authority
 Energy Regulatory Authority (Albania)
 Electricity distribution companies by country

References

External links 

 

Energy regulatory authorities
Government agencies of Botswana
Electricity authorities